The 1991–92 Wills Trophy (named after sponsor Wills of ITC Limited) was a triangular one-day international cricket tournament held at Sharjah between 17 October and 25 October 1991. It involved the national cricket teams of Pakistan, West Indies and India. Pakistan won the tournament after beating India in the final on 25 October.

Group stage 
Pre-tournament favourites Pakistan won despite losing their first two matches and their position looked helpless until the West Indies failed to score two runs off three balls in the third.

1st ODI

2nd ODI
Vinod Kambli and Javagal Srinath made their ODI debuts for India.

3rd ODI

4th ODI

5th ODI

6th ODI

Final
Sanjay Manjrekar of India won the Player of the Series Award

References 

International cricket competitions from 1991–92 to 1994
One Day International cricket competitions
ITC Limited